Bentivar is a historic home and farm located near Charlottesville, Albemarle County, Virginia.  It is a one-story, double-pile brick residence, with
English basement and clearstory attic.  It has a Palladian piano nobile plan. The traditional date for the building of Bentivar is 1795, but rebuilt about 1830 after a fire. Also on the property is a stone structure, apparently originally used as a dairy; ice pit; and graveyard.

It was added to the National Register of Historic Places in 2005.

References

Houses on the National Register of Historic Places in Virginia
Palladian Revival architecture in Virginia
Houses completed in 1830
Houses in Albemarle County, Virginia
National Register of Historic Places in Albemarle County, Virginia
1830 establishments in Virginia